Super Speeds is a company in India which designs and constructs open-wheeled Formula Cars for Indian National championship series. For more than three decades this outfit has been the only full-fledged Indian company entirely dedicated to indigenous design and construction of race cars in India.

Founding and beginnings
The company was started by late Indian motorsport legend S. Karivardhan in the 1980s in Coimbatore as an automobile racing team. During his years, the outfit initially operated as a Racecar Team. From 1988 to 1995 the team also entered Formula 3 with TOM'S Toyota and Dallara Mugen Honda for the annual Madras Grand Prix races. In 1995 Super Speeds entered into an agreement with JK Tyres to establish their Rally team and also provide technical assistance to establish their Racing activities. Later after Karivardhan's demise in 1995, the company was purchased by LGB, the makers of Rolon chains and sprockets and was turned into a race car construction company. Today the company is headed by B. Vijay Kumar. Till 2003 the company was also engaged into various trading activities related to automotive and engineering.

Recent years
In recent years the company has designed and constructed Formula LGB Swift, Formula LGB Hyundai and Formula Rolon Chevrolet cars. Tough part of LGB, the parent company rarely promotes Super Speeds.

The company's current activities are to design and construct racecars, automotive engine servicing and leasing and precision machining. The company is sole supplier of Formula Cars to its sister company LG Sports.

List of Cars constructed

Karivardhan Years
 Formula India (Fiat)
Formula Atlantic (Black Beauty)
Formula Monoposto India
FISSME - 1987
McDowell 1000 - 1987

LGB Years
Formula LGB Swift - 2003
SuperSpeeds Zen Saloon - 2003 
LGB Sportster - 2005
Formula Rolon Chevrolet - 2005
Formula LGB Hyundai - 2006

Further Resources
 Presenting Formula Rolon
 Financial Express News
 The Indian formulas

Indian racing cars
Motorsport in India
Automotive motorsports and performance companies